John of Montson (Juan de Monzón) (born at Monzón, Spain;  1340 – after 1412) was an Aragonese Dominican theologian and controversialist. His refusal to give up his beliefs regarding the Immaculate Conception resulted in his condemnation and clandestine exile to Spain.

Condemnation of his opinions

He joined the Dominicans probably in Valencia. In 1383 he was lecturing on theology at Valencia Cathedral. Thence he went to Paris, taught in the convent of St. James there, and obtained the mastership of theology in 1387.

Here he entered the field of controversy on the question of the Immaculate Conception, which was not then defined. Maintaining the proposition that the Blessed Virgin was conceived without sin was heretical, he aroused against him the faculty of the University of Paris. They condemned fourteen propositions from his lectures, warned him, first privately, then publicly, to retract, and when he refused carried the matter to Pierre Orgement, Bishop of Paris, who promulgated a decree of excommunication against all who should defend the forbidden theses. The faculty issued letters condemnatory of Montson's errors and conduct, which Denifle conjectures, from their acerbity of speech, were written by Pierre d'Ailly. Denifle also says Montson would not have been condemned had he not declared the doctrine of the Immaculate Conception heretical.

Appeal and flight

Montesono appealed to Pope Clement VIII, who cited him and the university faculty to Avignon. Later, foreseeing that the case was going against him, Montson, despite the command under pain of excommunication to remain at Avignon, secretly withdrew into Aragon, then went to Sicily, changing his allegiance to Pope Urban VI, Clement's rival. There and in Spain, whither he afterwards returned, he filled several important positions. In 1412 Alfonso, Duke of Gandia, chose him as head of a legation sent to defend his claim to the crown of Aragon.

Works

Besides four works against Clement's claim as pope, he wrote: "Tractatus de Conceptione B. Virginis", a number of sermons, and various opuscula in the vernacular.

References

Attribution
 This entry cites:
Quétif and Échard, Scriptores Ord. Praed., I (Paris, 1719), 691;
Hugo von Hurter, Nomenclator;
Denifle, Chartul., III (Paris, 1894), 486–533.

Spanish Dominicans
Spanish Christian theologians
1340s births
15th-century deaths
14th-century people from the Kingdom of Aragon
Medieval Spanish theologians